Gordon J. Linton (born March 26, 1948) served as Administrator of the Federal Transit Administration in the United States Department of Transportation ( 1993-1999). He was nominated by President William Jefferson Clinton, confirmed by the United States Senate and appointed by the President on August 6, 1993. He previously was elected and served six terms as a  Democratic member of the Pennsylvania House of Representatives. First elected on November 2, 1982 ,he represented the 200th legislative district of Philadelphia, Pennsylvania (1983- 1993).

References

Democratic Party members of the Pennsylvania House of Representatives
Living people
United States Department of Transportation officials
1948 births
African-American state legislators in Pennsylvania
21st-century African-American people
20th-century African-American people